Taeniotes xanthostictus is a species of beetle in the family Cerambycidae. It was described by Henry Walter Bates in 1880. It is known from Mexico a Colombia, Ecuador and Peru.

References

xanthostictus
Beetles described in 1880